The California Home School Sports League (CHSS) is a high school athletic league for home school students in California, USA. The member schools are not part of the California Interscholastic Federation (CIF), the primary governing body for high school sports in California. The CHSSL includes team from across the whole state. 

Christian Heritage Sports (CHS Sports) began in 1995 with a summer soccer camp led by Jeff Paterson. September 1995 was the beginning of a physical education program of one-day-a-week athletics. In 2003, the organization created a 501c3 non-profit organization, California Home School Sports. In 2006, CHSS became the league for home school teams in Southern California.

Sports
Baseball
Basketball
Football (8-man)
Golf
Soccer
Softball
Tennis
Track and field
Volleyball

Teams

References

California high school athletic leagues
Homeschooling in the United States